Francisco Javier Fernández may refer to:

 Francisco Javier Fernández Clamont (born 1972), Mexican politician affiliated to the PRI
 Francisco Fernández (Chilean footballer) (born 1975), Chilean footballer born Francisco Javier Fernández Torrejón
 Javi Fernández (footballer, born 1988) (born 1988), Spanish footballer born Francisco Javier 'Javi' Fernández Luque
 Francisco Javier Fernández (politician), Francisco Javier Fernández, Andalusian politician

See also
 Javier Fernández (disambiguation)
 Francisco Fernández (disambiguation)